Thumbay Group is a UAE-based diversified international business conglomerate, headquartered in DIFC - Dubai, with operations across 20 sectors including education, healthcare, medical research, diagnostics, retail pharmacy, health communications, retail opticals, wellness, nutrition stores, hospitality, real estate, publishing, technology, media, events, medical tourism, trading and marketing, and distribution. The group is headed by Dr. Thumbay Moideen, who is the Founder and President. Thumbay Group is the owner of Gulf Medical University and chain of Thumbay Hospitals and Clinics.

History
In 1998, Dr. Thumbay Moideen was the first expatriate to be invited by the Rulers of Ajman to start a medical college in the UAE. Thumbay Group's first venture Gulf Medical University was established to meet
the needs of students wishing to pursue higher education in medicine and healthcare sciences. This ultimately became a destination for medical education—not only for local students, but for students from over 75 countries and staff from 25 countries.

Thumbay Group has set up business operations in 20 sectors, since 1998. Today, the Group has developed interests in education, hospitals, medical centers, diagnostic centers, health clubs, pharmacies, retail outlets, coffee shops, and nutrition stores spread out across the Emirates and in India. The organization has close to 5000 employees in the UAE. Thumbay Group is listed among the “Top 100 Companies making an impact in the Arab World” by Forbes Middle East.

Brands
Thumbay Group also owns the following Business Enterprises:

 Gulf Medical University: The flagship project of Thumbay Group, the University caters to students of 75 nationalities and offers courses in medicine and healthcare ranging from Bachelor's to Masters, from short term to online courses.
 Thumbay Hospital:  A network of academic hospitals in Ajman, Dubai, Sharjah & Fujairah in the UAE and in Hyderabad, India.
 Thumbay Clinic: Chain of family clinics. Presently located at Ajman, Fujairah, Sharjah, Dubai, Umm Al Quwain and Ras Al Khaimah, in addition to the recently opened Thumbay Clinic ELITE at Ajman.
 Thumbay Pharmacy: Chain of pharmacies with multiple branches in Dubai, Ajman, Fujairah, Sharjah, Ras Al Khaimah, Umm Al Quwain & Hyderabad.
 Nutri Plus Vita Store: A chain of nutrition stores with presence in Ajman, Sharjah, Fujairah and Dubai.
 Zo & Mo Opticals: A chain of optical shops in Ajman, Dubai, Sharjah and Fujairah.
 The Flower Shoppe: Floral Shop in Ajman.
 Thumbay Medical Tourism:Promotes Thumbay Group’s healthcare services to international patients visiting the UAE.
 Thumbay Labs: One of the largest networks of CAP-accredited private diagnostic labs in the Middle East region. Branches throughout the UAE as well as in Hyderabad - India.
 Health Communications Division: assists in the delivery of programs (conferences, workshops, symposia and seminars).
 Body & Soul Health Clubs & Spas: An International chain of Health Clubs with branches in Ajman, Sharjah and Dubai, including ELITE outlets and kids' gym.
 HEALTH MAgazine: A BPA-audited bi-monthly, bilingual magazine focusing on health & lifestyle.
 The Terrace Restaurant: A multi-cuisine restaurant chain. The HACCP-certified flagship outlet is located in Al Jurf, Ajman.
 Blends and Brews Coffee Shoppe: UAE-born signature coffee shop outlets with outlets across the UAE and in Hyderabad, India.
 Thumbay Marketing and Distribution Company (TMDC): Partners with healthcare product manufacturers, fashion brands, educational product suppliers to distribute and market their products.
 Thumbay Builders:  One of the largest real estate companies in the Northern Emirates, UAE.
 Thumbay Media: Media provider.
 Thumbay Technologies: IT company.

See also 

 Thumbay Moideen
 Gulf Medical University
 Thumbay Hospital

References

Conglomerate companies of the United Arab Emirates
Conglomerate companies established in 1998